AeroLogic GmbH is a German cargo airline based in Schkeuditz near Leipzig. It is a joint-venture between DHL and Lufthansa Cargo which operates scheduled international and long-haul cargo services out of its hubs Leipzig/Halle Airport and Frankfurt Airport.

History
The company was founded by DHL Express and Lufthansa Cargo on 12 September 2007. Flight operations started on 29 June 2009, following the delivery of its first aircraft on 12 May of that year, a Boeing 777 Freighter, making AeroLogic the first German operator of that type.

Destinations
AeroLogic's operations are broadly divided in two. From Monday to Friday it mainly flies to Asia, serving the DHL network. On weekends, it mainly operates to the United States on behalf of Lufthansa Cargo. AeroLogic operates services to the following destinations:

Fleet

As of January 2023, the AeroLogic fleet consists of the following aircraft:

References

External links

Official website

Airlines of Germany
Airlines established in 2007
Cargo airlines of Germany
DHL
Lufthansa
German companies established in 2007
Joint ventures
Cargo airlines